Ethan Christopher Calleja (born 2 December 1999) is an Australian synchronised swimmer. He is the first male synchronised swimmer to compete internationally for Australia. Together with Danielle Kettlewell he placed fifth in the mixed duet event at the 2019 FINA World Aquatic Championships.

Career

Swimming 
Calleja had a 13 years long swimming career within Australia. Calleja broke 25 records over his career of which a number remain. He represented Western Australia at five School Sport Australia Swimming championships, and was elected as the team captain in 2016 and 2017. He also competed at the 2014 and 2016 Australian Swimming Championships.

Synchronised swimming 
Calleja and Kettlewell won the mixed duet event at the 2019 Hancock Prospecting Artistic Swimming Australian National Championships. They participated in the 2019 FINA World Series – China Open, and placed fifth in the free mixed duet event, becoming the first two Australians to compete in this event internationally. They also reached the final of the mixed duet free routine event.

Calleja appeared in the documentary Treading Water, conducted by students at Edith Cowan University and  directed by Corina Stagg.

References

External links 

Male synchronized swimmers
Artistic swimmers at the 2019 World Aquatics Championships
1999 births
Australian synchronised swimmers
Living people
Sportspeople from Perth, Western Australia
Sportsmen from Western Australia